Maai Mahiu is a town in Kenya's Nakuru County that means "hot water" in native Kikuyu language.

Maai Mahiu has a train station as well as an inland container depot on the Nairobi–Malaba Standard Gauge Railway, which was inaugurated in October 2019.

References 

Populated places in Nakuru County